Amyrea is a plant genus of the family Euphorbiaceae first described as a genus in 1941. It is native to Madagascar and to nearby Mayotte Island in the Indian Ocean.

Species

References

Euphorbiaceae genera
Acalyphoideae
Taxa named by Jacques Désiré Leandri